Mohammad Sadoughi (1909–1982) known as "Sevomin-Shahide-Mehrab" (the 3rd martyr of Mihrab) is an Iranian Twelver Shia Ayatollah who was born in Yazd. He was a/the representative of Yazd people in the assembly of experts. He also was appointed as the Imam of Friday Prayer in the city of Yazd by the decree of the former supreme leader of Iran, Seyyed Ruhollah Khomeini in 1980.

This Shia cleric was born in a religious/cleric family. His father was (Ayatollah) Mirza-Taleb who was from the known clerics of the city who was also the Imam of Prayer in the mosque of "Rozeye-Mohammadieh (Hazireh)". He used to study at old-education in the school of AbdolRahman-Khan. Afterwards, he departed for Isfahan; later on came back to his birth city. Then, he departed to Qom, and kept on his education in Hawzah. Sadoughi was finally assassinated by People's Mujahedin of Iran on 2 July  1982 after saying Friday Prayer.

Teachers 
 Abdul-Karim Haeri Yazdi
 Sadr al-Din al-Sadr 
 Shahab ud-Din Mar'ashi Najafi
 Seyyed Mohammad-Taqi Khansari
 Seyyed Mohammad-Hojjat Kouhkamari

Students 
 Mohammad-Taqi Ja'fari
 Morteza Motahhari
 Ahmad Jannati
 Mohammad Fazel Lankarani
 Yousef Saanei
 Seyyed Hashem Rasouli Mahallati
 Majid Jaefari Tabar
 Ali Qoddousi

References 

1909 births
1982 deaths
People from Yazd
Iranian ayatollahs
Iranian terrorism victims
People assassinated by the People's Mojahedin Organization of Iran
Members of the Assembly of Experts for Constitution